The 2022–23 season is BG Pathum United's third consecutive season in Thai League 1, following promotion in 2019. 

In addition to the domestic league, the club will also compete in this season's editions of the Thai FA Cup and the AFC Champions League.

Squad

Transfer

In

Pre-Season

Note 1: 

Mid-Season

Out 
Pre-Season

Note 1: 

Mid-Season

Loan In 
Mid-Season

Note 1:

Loan In
Mid-Season

Loan Out 
Pre-Season

Mid-Season

Return from loan 
Pre-Season

Note 1: Kevin Ingreso loan to Sri Pahang FC (Malaysia) was further extended till Dec 2023.

Note 2: Siroch Chatthong returned to the club and moved on to Nakhon Ratchasima for another loan.

Mid-Season

Extension / Retained

Friendlies

Pre-Season Friendly

Mid-Season Friendly

Competitions

Champions Cup

Matches

Thai League 1

Matches

Thai FA Cup

Matches

Thai League Cup

Matches

2022 AFC Champions League

Group stage

Knockout stage
Round of 16

Quarter-finals

Team statistics

Appearances and goals

Notes

References 

BG Pathum United F.C. seasons
BG Pathum
BG Pathum